The  was an early class of submarines of the Imperial Japanese Navy. It was also called the "Vickers C-3 class".

Background
A final two vessels of the British C-class submarine design were built completely in Japan by the Kure Naval Arsenal as part of the emergency expansion of the Imperial Japanese Navy due to World War I. Although the design was considered obsolete by this time, these vessels were felt necessary to meet the perceived threat of German submarine activity in Japanese coastal waters. Physically almost identical to the Ha-3 class, the two vessels incorporated a number of improvements, including a change in the location of the rudder for better control, and the addition of two externally mounted torpedo tubes to double the attack capability from previous designs. Arriving in Japan during the closing stages of the war, neither vessel was ever used in combat.

Ships in class
, laid down 1 August 1916; launched 15 March 1916; commissioned 1 November 1916 as 2nd Class Submersible No.16; reclassified as 3rd class submarine on 1 April 1919; renamed Ha-7 on 15 June 1923, decommissioned on 1 December 1929.<ref name=Nishida>Nishida,  Materials of the Imperial Japanese Navy</ref>
, laid down 1 August 1916; launched 15 March 1916; commissioned 2 February 1917 as 2nd Class Submersible No.17; reclassified as 3rd class submarine on 1 April 1919; renamed Ha-8'' on 15 June 1923; decommissioned on 1 December 1929.

Notes

References

External links

Submarine classes
Submarines of the Imperial Japanese Navy
Ships built by Kure Naval Arsenal
1916 ships